Dame Audrey Charlotte Georgiana Buller  (4 August 1884 – 22 June 1953) was a British hospital administrator and the founder of the first school dedicated to occupational therapy in the United Kingdom.

Buller was born in Crediton, Devon, the only daughter of General Sir Redvers Buller and his wife, Lady Audrey, youngest daughter of the 4th Marquess Townshend. She joined the British Red Cross Society and by the outbreak of the First World War in 1914 she was Deputy County Director of the Voluntary Aid Organisation for Devon. She was asked to establish a hospital in Exeter; by August 1915 the original 160 beds had grown to over 1,400.

Established as the Red Cross Voluntary Aided Hospital, in 1915 it was taken over by the War Office as the Central Military Hospital Exeter and Buller remained as administrator, the only woman to hold such a post in a major military hospital during the war. She was also responsible for forty-four affiliated auxiliary hospitals. By 1918 more than 35,000 patients had passed through the hospital. For her work she was appointed Dame Commander of the Order of the British Empire (DBE) in the 1920 civilian war honours and also awarded the Royal Red Cross 1st Class (RRC).

After the war, Buller began collecting funds to establish an orthopaedic hospital for children in Devon. In 1927 she opened the Princess Elizabeth Orthopaedic Hospital in Exeter. In 1937 this was followed by the St Loye's Training Centre for Cripples (which later became St Loye's College for Training the Disabled and is now St Loye's Foundation), also in Exeter. In 1932 she opened the Cripple's Training College (which later became Queen Elizabeth's Training College and is now Queen Elizabeth's Foundation for Disabled People), which is based in Leatherhead, Surrey. She also founded the British Council for Rehabilitation.

She was an early disability rights pioneer, and often spoke on the subject of disability with great passion and eloquence:

Buller died at her home in Exeter from cancer in 1953, aged 68. She never married and had no children.

Footnotes

References
Biography, Oxford Dictionary of National Biography
Obituary, The Times, 23 June 1953

External links
The War Workers, greatwarfiction.wordpress.com; accessed 26 March 2016.

1884 births
1953 deaths
English activists
English women activists
Founders of English schools and colleges
Deaths from cancer in England
Dames Commander of the Order of the British Empire
People from Crediton
Members of the Royal Red Cross
English humanitarians
Place of birth missing
British women in World War I
Georgiana
British disability rights activists
British hospital administrators
20th-century philanthropists
20th-century English women
20th-century English people